Nikki Nelson (born January 3, 1969, in La Mesa, California) is an American country music singer. When she was seven, she and her family moved to Topaz Lake, Nevada. In 1991, she replaced Paulette Carlson as lead vocalist for the band Highway 101, and their first album together was that year's Bing Bang Boom. She also sang lead vocals on the band's next album, 1993's The New Frontier.

Carlson returned to Highway 101 in 1995 for the album Reunited, and Nelson signed a solo recording deal with Columbia Records, Nashville. She released the single "Too Little Too Much" in 1997 and charted at No. 62 on the Hot Country Songs charts. Chrislynn Lee replaced Carlson after the Reunited album, and remained that band's lead vocalist until 2006, when Nelson rejoined.

Discography

Singles

Music videos

References

1969 births
American women country singers
American country singer-songwriters
Columbia Records artists
Living people
Singer-songwriters from California
Highway 101 members
Country musicians from California
21st-century American women